WWJD (91.7 FM, "Eagle 91.7") is a radio station licensed to serve Pippa Passes, Kentucky.  The station is owned by Alice Lloyd College.  It broadcasts in a Contemporary Christian music format.

The station has been assigned these call letters by the Federal Communications Commission, by the college's request, since August 29, 1997.

References

External links
 WWJD official website
 
 
 

WJDo
Contemporary Christian radio stations in the United States
Alice Lloyd College
Radio stations established in 1997
1997 establishments in Kentucky
WJD